The Type 076 landing helicopter dock is a class of planned Chinese amphibious assault ship. Compared to the Type 075, the Type 076 is expected to have an electromagnetic aircraft catapult and arresting gear for operating fixed-wing aircraft, likely unmanned combat aerial vehicles (UCAV).

Development
In mid-2020, official request for proposals (RFP) associated with the Type 076 were discovered on the Internet. Specifications from the RFPs were for a 21 megawatt gas turbine and diesel powerplants, a medium-voltage direct current integrated power system, and a well deck. The specified aviation equipment included a "UAV deck", a munition elevator, a 30-ton flight deck elevator, an electromagnetic catapult and arresting gear.

Design
H. I. Sutton of the Forbes believes the Type 076 will have a full-length flight deck. The ship will likely operate helicopters and UCAVs; the Hongdu GJ-11 and Flying Dragon-2 UCAVs may be candidates.  A well deck may also be included.

See also
People's Liberation Army Navy Surface Force
List of active People's Liberation Army Navy ships

References

Helicopter carrier classes
Amphibious warfare vessel classes
Amphibious warfare vessels of the People's Liberation Army Navy